Noah Aubrey Rosenberg is a geneticist working in evolutionary biology, human genetics, and population genetics, now Professor at Stanford University. His research is concerned with quantifiable changes in the human genome over time, and he is famous for his studies of human genetic clustering. He is the editor-in-chief of Theoretical Population Biology.

Education
Rosenberg graduated from the Illinois Mathematics and Science Academy in 1993 and earned his BA in mathematics from Rice University in 1997, his MS in mathematics from Stanford University in 1999, and his PhD in biology from Stanford University in 2001.

Career and research
Rosenberg completed postdoctoral research in Computational Biology from University of Southern California (2001–2005).

References

External links
The Noah Sheets A compilation of essential trigonometry theorems, formulas, and values

Evolutionary biologists
Population geneticists
Living people
Rice University alumni
Stanford University alumni
University of Southern California fellows
University of Michigan faculty
Stanford University School of Medicine faculty
Year of birth missing (living people)